SS Amiral Magon was a French ocean liner converted into a troopship in World War I, which was torpedoed and sunk in the Mediterranean Sea on 28 January 1917 with 203 casualties.

Amiral Magon was built as an ocean liner for service between France and French Indochina. The ship was operational between 1905 and 1914, when she was requisitioned by the French Army and converted into a hospital ship in 1914 and later into a troopship for use in World War I.

On 25 January 1917 she was sailing from Marseille for Thessaloniki with another troopship, escorted by the French destroyer Arc, with some 935 soldiers and 80 crew on board. She was attacked and torpedoed at 11:10 by German U-boat , commanded by Walther Forstmann. There were also many horses on board. The survivors were rescued by Arc and by another French destroyer, Bombarde, which arrived at the site at 17:00.

Sources

 40ème Régiment d'Infanterie: testimonies of soldiers on board
 Technical data, discussions 
 Wreck site

1904 ships
Maritime incidents in 1917
Passenger ships of France
Ships built in France
Ships sunk by German submarines in World War I
World War I shipwrecks in the Mediterranean Sea